Jose Rene Martinez (born June 14, 1983) is an American actor, motivational speaker, and former U.S. Army soldier. Starting in 2008, he played the role of Brot Monroe on the ABC daytime drama All My Children.  He is the winner of Season 13 of ABC's Dancing with the Stars. Martinez served as the Grand Marshal of the 2012 Rose Parade. He is currently costarring on the syndicated action series SAF3.

In 2003, Martinez sustained severe burns to over 34 percent of his body while serving as an Army infantryman in Iraq. Since his recovery, he has traveled around the country speaking about his experiences to corporations, veterans groups, schools, and other organizations.

Early life
Martinez was born in Shreveport, Louisiana, to Maria Zavala. He has two sisters who were raised with his mother's family in El Salvador. His sister Anabel died before Martinez ever had the chance to meet her. Martinez has never met his father. At a young age, he moved with his mother to Hope, Arkansas. At 17, just prior to his senior year of high school, they moved to Dalton, Georgia.

Career

Military career

In September 2002, Martinez enlisted in the Army and underwent Basic and Advanced Training at Fort Benning, Georgia, where, upon his graduation, was assigned the Military Occupational Specialty (MOS) of 11B (Infantryman). After reporting to Fort Campbell in January 2003, he was assigned to Delta Company, 2nd Battalion, 502nd Infantry Regiment of the 101st Airborne Division.

In February 2003, he was deployed to the Middle East. Two months later, Martinez was driving a Humvee when its left front tire hit an IED; Martinez suffered smoke inhalation and severe burns to more than 34 percent of his body. He was evacuated to Ramstein AB, Germany, for immediate care and transferred to the Army Institute of Surgical Research Burn Center at Brooke Army Medical Center (BAMC) in San Antonio, Texas. He spent 34 months at BAMC and has undergone 33 plastic surgery and skin graft surgeries.

Motivational speaking
Martinez has become a motivational speaker. In 2008, he was honored as a "Shining Star of Perseverance" by the WillReturn Council of Assurant Employee Benefits. The following year, the nonprofit Iraq and Afghanistan Veterans of America (IAVA) presented him with the Veterans Leadership Award.

Acting career
In 2008, Martinez was cast in ABC's daytime drama All My Children as Brot Monroe. His character also served with the Army in Iraq and was injured in combat. Martinez first appeared on the program on Friday, November 7, 2008. In 2012, he appeared on the season six finale of Army Wives as a physical therapist treating injured veterans. In 2013 he began on the syndicated SAF3 portraying a Los Angeles County Firefighter/Paramedic and veteran USAF Pararescue Jumper Alfonso Rivera.

Work with burn-survivor community
Martinez first began providing support to fellow burn survivors while being treated for his burn injuries at Brooke Army Medical Center. He has served as a member of the board of directors of The Phoenix Society for Burn Survivors. He first attended the Phoenix Society's World Burn Congress in 2008 and was a featured speaker at the 2010 World Burn Congress. Martinez had a fellow burn survivor, Jenna Bullen, attend taping of "Dancing with the Stars" as his guest and has taped a public service announcement with her on behalf of the Phoenix Society for Burn Survivors. Martinez is also active with "Operation Finally Home", an organization that builds housing for American veterans and their families so they may live mortgage-free. Said Martinez of the project: “We’re not just giving them keys to open up the door to go into their home. We’re also giving them the key to opportunity, the key to know there are people who appreciate them, the key to positivity, the key to new beginnings.”

Dancing with the Stars
Martinez often tells the story of how his mother helped him relearn to walk eight weeks after major foot surgery. Martinez's win also marked the first win for his partner, Karina Smirnoff. He credits her with pushing him to excel in routine after routine leading him to win the competition.

Radio
Martinez's first appearance as a radio host was December 21, 2012, when he stood in for Bill Carroll of KFI-AM 640. On January 24, 2013, he began his regularly scheduled radio show on Sunday evenings.

References

External links
 
 

1983 births
Living people
American people of Salvadoran descent
Male actors from Louisiana
United States Army personnel of the Iraq War
American motivational speakers
American male soap opera actors
American male television actors
Dancing with the Stars (American TV series) winners
Hispanic and Latino American male actors
Participants in American reality television series
Actors from Shreveport, Louisiana
United States Army soldiers
Burn survivors